Eucereon erythrolepsis is a moth of the subfamily Arctiinae. It was described by Harrison Gray Dyar Jr. in 1910. It is found in the US state of Texas, Mexico, Guatemala and Costa Rica.

References

 Arctiidae genus list at Butterflies and Moths of the World of the Natural History Museum

erythrolepsis
Moths described in 1910